Tiam (چشم ها lit. Eyes) is an Iranian main battle tank optimized from the Sabalan with a 105 mm gun. The tank was announced on April 13, 2016, and has a similarity to the Type 59 turret, with a Sabalan chassis, which is an Iranian modernized version of the M47M Patton. Iran stated that it possessed a brand new turret housing a smoothbore 105 mm cannon.  Iran said it had a new fire control system, and new communication equipment, sideskirts and other improvements and cost less than half of the price of the Zulfiqar main battle tank.

History 
Before the fall of the Shah, Iran obtained modernized versions from the United States of the M47 Patton, also called M47M. The M47M was upgraded with engine and fire control elements from the M60A1, and the assistant driver eliminated to store more 90 mm ammunition. Iran created the Tiam tank from a modernized version of the  M47M and a modified Chinese Type 59 turret. After the Tiam was unveiled to the public, Ground Force Commander Brigadier General Ahmad Reza Pourdastan announced there would also be a new Karrar main battle tanks.

Design 
The main armament of the Tiam consists of a 105 mm smoothbore gun fitted with a fume extractor and a thermal sleeve. It has a crew of four, including commander, gunner, loader and driver and has a coaxial 7.62 mm machine gun and a 12.7 mm DShK heavy machine gun mounted on swivel station at the commander hatch. The Tiam was fitted with latest generation of composite armor, with explosive reactive armor (ERA) panels mounted on the front of the hull and turret.

See also 

Military of Iran
Iranian military industry
Current Equipment of the Iranian Army
Tanks of Iran

References 

Main battle tanks of Iran
Post–Cold War main battle tanks
Military vehicles introduced in the 2010s